Al Froosh (also spelled Al Furoush) is a village in the municipality of Umm Salal in Qatar. It is directly west of the town of Al Kharaitiyat and southwest of the town of Umm Salal Mohammed.

Etymology
In Arabic, "furoush" means "mat". The area was given this name because it was matted by a thin layer of vegetation.

Infrastructure
Starting in 2015, Ashghal has been carrying out a major infrastructure project in the village. In line with the project, Al Froosh is being jointly developed with Al Kharaitiyat over an area of 1.87 million square meters. Developments will include 420 housing units and an addition of 22.7 km of road and 17.4 km of sewage. The project had an estimated completion date of 2019.

References 

Populated places in Umm Salal